Santacharis are a genus of very large, air-breathing land snails, terrestrial pulmonate gastropod molluscs in the family Bothriembryontidae.

Species
 Santacharis fuligineus (L. Pfeiffer, 1854)
 Santacharis hullianus Iredale, 1927
 Santacharis salomonis (L. Pfeiffer, 1852)

References

 Neubert, E., Chérel-Mora C. & Bouchet P. (2009). Polytypy, clines, and fragmentation: The bulimes of New Caledonia revisited (Pulmonata, Orthalicoidea, Placostylidae). In P. Grancolas (ed.), Zoologia Neocaledonica 7. Biodiversity studies in New Caledonia. Mémoires du Muséum National d'Histoire Naturelle. 198: 37–131.

External links
 Iredale, T. (1927). New molluscs from Vanikoro. Records of the Australian Museum. 16(1): 73-80, pl. 5

Bothriembryontidae
Gastropod genera